Louis Appignani, (born March 30, 1933, in Manhattan, New York City), is an entrepreneur and philanthropist from Miami, Florida. He is chairman and founder of Louja Realty Inc., he has been chairman and founder of Computer Education Inc. and, until 2000, Barbizon International Modeling School.

Biography
He was born March 30, 1933, in Manhattan in New York City. Appignani attended postgraduate studies in economics at Indiana University. He graduated from Baruch College of the City University of New York, earning his M.S. degree in finance from Columbia University. He has served on the boards a number of professional civic organizations.

In 2001 Appignani established the Appignani Foundation to “support secular activities that will address significant, viable and long term human goals on our planet.” He also founded the IHEU Appignani Center for Bioethics, formerly a branch of the International Humanist and Ethical Union but now under the aegis of the American Humanist Association (AHA).  It is "dedicated to providing thoughtful, timely research and analyses of bioethical challenges facing the global community." He also founded the Appignani Humanist Legal Center, a project of the AHA that uses qualified humanist-minded attorneys to pursue cases that are "a violation of the law as well as of Humanist principles of what we consider religious liberty, freedoms, and civil rights."

References

1933 births
Living people
American atheists
American humanists
American business executives